Pauridiantha is an afrotropical genus of plant in family Rubiaceae. It contains the following species :
 Pauridiantha afzelii (Hiern) Bremek.
 Pauridiantha bequaertii (De Wild.) Bremek.
 Pauridiantha bridelioides Verdc.
 Pauridiantha callicarpoides (Hiern) Bremek.
 Pauridiantha camposii (G.Taylor) N.Hallé
 Pauridiantha canthiiflora Hook.f.
 Pauridiantha coalescens Ntore & Dessein
 Pauridiantha dewevrei (De Wild. & T.Durand) Bremek.
 Pauridiantha divaricata (K.Schum.) Bremek.
 Pauridiantha efferata N.Hallé
 Pauridiantha floribunda (K.Schum. & K.Krause) Bremek.
 Pauridiantha hirsuta Ntore
 Pauridiantha hirtella (Benth.) Bremek.
 Pauridiantha insularis (Hiern) Bremek.
 Pauridiantha kahuziensis Ntore
 Pauridiantha kizuensis Bremek.
 Pauridiantha letestuana (De Wild. & T.Durand) Ntore & Dessein
 Pauridiantha liberiensis Ntore
 Pauridiantha liebrechtsiana (De Wild. & T.Durand) Ntore & Dessein
 Pauridiantha mayumbensis (R.D.Good) Bremek.
 Pauridiantha micrantha  Bremek.
 Pauridiantha microphylla R.D.Good
 Pauridiantha muhakiensis Ntore
 Pauridiantha multiflora K.Schum.
 Pauridiantha paucinervis (Hiern) Bremek.
 Pauridiantha pierlotii N.Hallé
 Pauridiantha pleiantha Ntore & Dessein
 Pauridiantha pyramidata (K.Krause) Bremek.
 Pauridiantha rubens (Benth.) Bremek.
 Pauridiantha schnellii N.Hallé
 Pauridiantha siderophila N.Hallé
 Pauridiantha smetsiana Ntore & Dessein
 Pauridiantha sylvicola (Hutch. & Dalz.) Bremek.
 Pauridiantha symplocoides (S.Moore.) Bremek.
 Pauridiantha talbotii (Wernham) Ntore & Dessein
 Pauridiantha udzungwaensis Ntore & Dessein
 Pauridiantha verticillata (De Wild. & T.Durand) N.Hallé
 Pauridiantha viridiflora (Schweinf. ex Hiern) Hepper

 
Rubiaceae genera
Taxonomy articles created by Polbot